Worth County is a county located in the northwestern portion of the U.S. state of Missouri. As of the 2020 census, the population was 1,973. It is the smallest county in the state in population and, excluding the independent city of St. Louis, the smallest in total area. Its county seat is Grant City. The county was organized February 8, 1861 and named for General William J. Worth, who served in the Mexican–American War. Worth County is also the youngest county in the state.

Geography
It is the smallest county in Missouri by area. Iowa is located to the north of Worth County.

Adjacent counties
 Taylor County, Iowa – northwest
 Ringgold County, Iowa – northeast
 Harrison County – east
 Gentry County – south
 Nodaway County – west

Demographics

2020 Census

2000 census
As of the census of 2000, there were 2,382 people, 1,009 households, and 677 families residing in the county.  The population density was 9 people per square mile (3/km2).  There were 1,245 housing units at an average density of 5 per square mile (2/km2).  The racial makeup of the county was 98.99% White, 0.17% Black or African American, 0.34% Native American, 0.08% Asian, and 0.42% from two or more races. Approximately 0.29% of the population were Hispanic or Latino of any race.

There were 1,009 households, out of which 28.90% had children under the age of 18 living with them, 56.40% were married couples living together, 7.70% had a female householder with no husband present, and 32.90% were non-families. 30.00% of all households were made up of individuals, and 16.70% had someone living alone who was 65 years of age or older. The average household size was 2.31 and the average family size was 2.85.

In the county, the population was spread out, with 24.30% under the age of 18, 6.80% from 18 to 24, 23.50% from 25 to 44, 23.10% from 45 to 64, and 22.30% who were 65 years of age or older. The median age was 42 years. For every 100 females there were 96.00 males. For every 100 females age 18 and over, there were 90.60 males.

The median income for a household in the county was $27,471, and the median income for a family was $34,044. Males had a median income of $24,138 versus $17,300 for females. The per capita income for the county was $14,367. About 10.90% of families and 14.30% of the population were below the poverty line, including 18.80% of those under age 18 and 11.50% of those age 65 or over.

Education

Public schools
 Worth County R-III School District – Grant City
 Worth County Elementary School (PK–6)
 Worth County High School (7–12)

Public libraries
 Worth County Library Association

Politics

Local
The Republican Party controls politics at the local level in Worth County. Republicans hold all but six of the elected positions in the county.

State

Worth County is part of the 1st district in the Missouri House of Representatives, currently held by Allen Andrews (R-Grant City).

Worth County is part of the 12th District in the Missouri Senate, currently held by Dan Hegeman (R-Cosby).

Federal

Worth County is included in Missouri's 6th Congressional District and is currently represented by Sam Graves (R-Tarkio) in the U.S. House of Representatives.

Missouri presidential preference primary (2008)

Former U.S. Senator Hillary Clinton (D-New York) received more votes, a total of 171, than any candidate from either party in Worth County during the 2008 presidential primary.

Communities

Cities
 Grant City (county seat)
 Sheridan

Towns
 Allendale

Villages
 Denver
 Irena
 Worth

Unincorporated communities
 Isadora
 Oxford
 Prohibition City

See also
 National Register of Historic Places listings in Worth County, Missouri

References

External links
 Digitized 1930 Plat Book of Worth County  from University of Missouri Division of Special Collections, Archives, and Rare Books
 Official website of Worth County, Missouri.

 
1861 establishments in Missouri
Populated places established in 1861